Painkiller: The Collected Works is a 1997 four disc box set by the American musical group Painkiller. The set contains the group's entire recorded output up to 1997: two EPs (Guts of a Virgin and Buried Secrets), the album Execution Ground and a live album previously released on the Japanese edition of Execution Ground.

Track listing
Disc zero
"Scud Attack" – 3:07
"Deadly Obstacle Collage" – 0:21
"Damage To The Mask" – 2:43
"Guts of A Virgin" – 1:19
"Handjob" – 0:10
"Portent" – 4:00
"Hostage" – 2:24
"Lathe of God" – 0:56
"Dr. Phibes" – 3:00
"Purgatory of Fiery Vulvas" – 0:26
"Warhead" – 1:12
"Devil's Eye" – 4:37
"Tortured Souls" – 1:52
"One-Eyed Pessary" – 1:50
"Trailmaker" – 0:03
"Blackhole Dub" – 3:29
"Buried Secrets" – 6:13
"The Ladder" – 0:22
"Executioner" – 2:48
"Black Chamber" – 2:28
"Skinned" – 0:54
"The Toll" – 6:25
"Marianne" – 7:50

Disc one:
"Parish of Tama (Ossuary Dub)" – 16:05
"Morning of Balachaturdasi" – 14:45
"Pashupatinath" – 13:47

Disc two:
"Pashupatinath (ambient)" – 20:00
"Parish of Tama (ambient)" – 19:19

Disc three:
"Gandhamadana" – 12:58
"Vaidurya" – 8:58
"Satapitaka" – 11:15
"Bodkyithangga" – 13:04
John Zorn & Eye encore:
"Black Bile" – 1:45
"Yellow Bile" – 0:58
"Blue Bile" – 2:40
"Crimson Bile" – 1:46
"Ivory Bile" – 1:26

Personnel
John Zorn – alto saxophone, vocals
Bill Laswell – bass
Mick Harris – drums, vocals
Justin Broadrick – guitar, drum machine, vocals on "Buried Secrets" and "The Toll"
G.C. Green – bass on "Buried Secrets" and "The Toll"
Yamatsuka Eye – vocals on "Bodkyithangga", "Black Bile", "Yellow Bile", "Blue Bile", "Crimson Bile", "Ivory Bile"

References

Painkiller (band) albums
Albums produced by John Zorn
John Zorn compilation albums
1997 compilation albums
Tzadik Records compilation albums